Liotipoma is a genus of sea snails, marine gastropod mollusks in the family Colloniidae.

Species
Species within the genus Liotipoma include:
 Liotipoma clausa McLean, 2012
 Liotipoma dimorpha McLean, 2012
 Liotipoma lifouensis McLean, 2012
 Liotipoma magna McLean, 2012
 Liotipoma mutabilis McLean, 2012
 Liotipoma solaris McLean, 2012
 Liotipoma splendida McLean, 2012
 Liotipoma wallisensis McLean & Kiel, 2007

References

 McLean J.H. & Kiel S. 2007. Cretaceous and living Colloniidae of the redefined subfamily Petropomatinae, with two new genera and one new species, with notes on opercular evolution in turbinoideans, and the fossil record of Liotiidae (Vetigastropoda: Turbinoidea). Paläontologische Zeitschrift 81(3): 254-266.
 McLean J.H. (2012) New species and genera of colloniids from Indo-Pacific coral reefs, with the definition of a new subfamily Liotipomatinae n. subfam. (Turbinoidea, Colloniidae). Zoosystema 34(2): 343-376

External links

Colloniidae